A suicide epidemic is a large number of suicides taking place over a period of time in a manner that resembles a disease epidemic. Such epidemics have occurred in the former Soviet Union in the 1990s, among police officers, on Indian reservations, and in Micronesia. The Werther effect occurs when suicides that are made publicly known encourage others to imitate them. It has been suggested that the teaching of stories such as Romeo and Juliet may encourage suicide among young people.

See also
 Mass suicide
 Epidemiology of suicide
 Copycat suicide

References

Epidemic
Epidemics